The Peruvian seaside cinclodes or surf cinclodes (Cinclodes taczanowskii) is a species of bird in the family Furnariidae. It is endemic to rocky shorelines in Peru. It is often considered a subspecies of the Chilean seaside cinclodes.

References

Peruvian seaside cinclodes
Birds of Peru
Endemic birds of Peru
Western South American coastal birds
Peruvian seaside cinclodes
Peruvian seaside cinclodes
Taxonomy articles created by Polbot